Georgi Kamenov (born 9 September 1941) is a former Bulgarian footballer who played as a striker.

Born in Gradeshnitsa, Vratsa Province, Kamenov spent 13 seasons of his career at Botev Vratsa. He is Botev's all-time top goalscorer in the Bulgarian A Group, scoring 150 goals for the club in 285 games.

References

1941 births
Living people
Bulgarian footballers
FC Botev Vratsa players
First Professional Football League (Bulgaria) players

Association football forwards